Palau competed at the 2017 Asian Indoor and Martial Arts Games held in Ashgabat, Turkmenistan from September 17 to 27. 10 participants competed in 3 different sports. Palau did not win any medals in the multi-sport event.

Palau made its debut in an Asian Indoor and Martial Arts Games for the first time at the multi-sport event held in Turkmenistan along with other Oceania nations.

Participants

References 

2017 in Palauan sport
Nations at the 2017 Asian Indoor and Martial Arts Games
Palau at the Asian Games